Citak can refer to:

 Citak language
 Çıtak, Çivril
 Çıtak, Güroymak
 Çıtak, Karakoçan